The 73rd Reserve Infantry Division (Korean: 제73동원보병사단) is a military formation of the Republic of Korea Reserve Forces (ROKA). The division was created on 1 April 1987. The division is subordinated to the Mobilization Force Command and is headquartered in Namyangju City, Gyeonggi Province. During the peacetime, they are in charge of recruit training and active as a second line military unit.

Organization

Headquarters:
Headquarters Battalion
Reconnaissance Battalion
Engineer Battalion
Armor Battalion (equipped with M48A3K tank)
Chemical Company		
Signal Battalion
Support Battalion
Medical Battalion
203rd Infantry Brigade
205th Infantry Brigade
206th Infantry Brigade
Artillery Brigade
3 Artillery Battalions (equipped with M101 howitzer)
Artillery Battalion (equipped with M114 howitzer)

See also
Korean Demilitarized Zone

References

InfDiv0073
InfDiv0073SK
Military units and formations established in 1987